{| 
 
{{Infobox ship career
|Hide header=
|Ship country=Canada
|Ship flag=
|Ship registry= Canada
|Ship name=SS Arlington
|Ship owner=Burke Towing and Salvage Company of Midland, Ontario
|Ship operator=Burke Towing and Salvage Company of Midland, Ontario
|Ship ordered=
|Ship builder= Detroit Shipbuilding Company, Wyandotte, Michigan
|Ship yard number=
|Ship laid down=1913
|Ship launched=1913
|Ship completed=1913
|Ship christened=1913
|Ship maiden voyage=1913
|Ship identification=
|Ship acquired=
|Ship nickname=
|Ship in service=
|Ship out of service= 
|Ship fate=Broke apart in heavy seas May 1, 1940
|Ship notes= 
}}

|}SS Arlington' was a Great Lakes steamship which was lost in Lake Superior on May 1, 1940.

Construction
Built in the yard of the Detroit Shipbuilding Company of Wyandotte, Michigan and intended for a career on the Great Lakes, the Arlington was a typical "canaller;" a steel-hulled, propeller-driven ship built to the specifications of the Saint Lawrence River locks as they existed at the time of her design and construction.

History
The Arlington was originally designated hull No. 192 in the Detroit Shipbuilding Company's yards in 1913, was first christened the F.P. Jones, then renamed the Glencadam in 1919.  The Mathews Steamship Company acquired her in 1936, and rechristened her Arlington, and the Burke Towing and Salvage Company retained the designation after purchasing her in 1936.  The Burke Company employed the Arlington in the grain hauling business in spring and fall, and pulp wood during the midsummer lull in traffic.  After the 1939 shipping season ended the Arlington's veteran skipper was released and the Burke Company hired Capt Frederick "Tatey Bug" Burke, brother of the ship's owners, to command the vessel for 1940.

Final voyage
Having been inspected and found to be in good order prior to the beginning of the 1940 season, the Arlington entered the harbor of Port Arthur, Ontario in late April, 1940, to be loaded with a cargo of about 98,000 bushels of wheat.  The ship steamed out of the port on the afternoon of April 30 shortly after the much larger , another lake freighter.  Though the Collingwood was larger and faster than the Arlington, it did not have a direction finder, which the Arlington did.  So, upon entering a fog, the Collingwoods captain, Thomas J. Carson, slowed his boat and allowed the Arlington to take the lead.

Though the routine weather reports indicated seasonably mild and breezy weather with light flurries, the low-slung Arlington – having only 3.5 feet of freeboard when fully loaded – was being boarded occasionally by heavy seas.  First mate Junis Macksey, a veteran ship's master in his own right, had instructed the wheelsman to follow a course along the north shore of Lake Superior, where the ship would be sheltered from the worst of the wind and waves, but where progress would be slower and less direct on its way to Whitefish Bay.  Captain Burke countermanded the order, and the more direct course away from shore was resumed.  First mate Macksey is said to have commented to Burke, "You just think you're going to Whitefish."

At 10:00pm on April 30 the wind kicked up to a gale and the seas began to consistently board the Arlington. As the seas worsened and the Arlington struggled to make headway, mate Macksey, who had taken over the pilothouse watch at 12:15am on May 1, became concerned about the state of the ship's hatches. At 12:30am both the Arlington and the Collingwood checked their speed to about 7.5 knots, and at the same time the Arlington turned into the wind in an attempt to allow second mate Arthur Ferris to venture out onto the deck to inspect the hatches. Captain Burke awoke from his sleep, entered the pilothouse, and turned the vessel back onto its original course once again.  Burke then returned to his cabin and went back to sleep. At 3:30am mate Macksey pounded on Burke's cabin door and insisted that the captain take command of his ship while Macksey himself attempted to inspect the hatches and repair them as necessary. But when Captain Burke finally entered the pilothouse to take command, it was clear that the number 5 hatch had burst and the Arlington had begun to take on water, and to list. At this point Captain Burke finally directed the wheelsman to set a course for the north shore, so that the ship could be grounded or beached, and later salvaged.

By 4:30am the fireman reported that the number 2 hold was filling with water, the cargo of wheat was expanding due to the dampness, the bulkhead was making cracking noises, and the hull was popping its rivets out.  Chief engineer Fred Gilbert announced that the ship was sinking, and the crew took the initiative to begin abandoning the ship.  The crew attempted to launch both of the ship's lifeboats – one could not be lowered into the water, but the other was successfully launched and brought around to the ship's lee, where it was sheltered from wind and waves – and the crew left the ship, all except for Captain Burke, who remained in the pilothouse.  According to the log of the Collingwood, which was standing by just 250 yards away, the Arlington foundered at 5:15am on May 1, and the lifeboat and its occupants were retrieved at 5:30am.

Notes

 

Clifford J. Martel (1913-2015), brother of Fred Martel of Little Current, Ontario, who was Cook No. 1 on the Arlington'' at the time of the sinking, reported December 27, 2010, that his brother Fred told him shortly after the sinking that the Captain had refused the crew's request to launch life boats and abandon ship, claiming that to do so without his authorization was an act of mutiny. The crew launched a life boat anyway and the ship sank by the bow within 15 minutes, showing the rudder and propeller as the stern rose into the air. Captain Burke remained on board and went down with the ship.

External links
 http://www.boatnerd.com/swayze/shipwreck/a.htm

1913 ships
Great Lakes freighters
World War II merchant ships of Canada
Shipwrecks of Lake Superior
Maritime incidents in May 1940
Ships built in Wyandotte, Michigan